Claire Huchet Bishop (30 December 1898 – 13 March 1993) was a Swiss children's writer and librarian. She wrote two Newbery Medal runners-up, Pancakes-Paris (1947) and All Alone (1953), and she won the Josette Frank Award for Twenty and Ten (1952). Her first English-language children's book became a classic: The Five Chinese Brothers, illustrated by Kurt Wiese and published in 1938, was named to the Lewis Carroll Shelf Award list in 1959.

Life

Claire Huchet was born in Geneva, Switzerland and grew up in France or Geneva. She attended the Sorbonne and started the first children's library in France. After marrying the American concert pianist Frank Bishop, she moved to the United States, worked for the New York City Public Library from 1932–36, and was an apologist for Roman Catholicism and an opponent of antisemitism.

She was a lecturer and storyteller throughout the US and was a children's book editor for Commonweal for some time.

Bishop was the President of International Council of Christians and Jews from 1975–77 and the Jewish-Christian Fellowship of France from 1976-81.

Two of her books were made into films.

After residing in New York for 50 years, Bishop returned to France and died in Paris in 1993. She was 94 years old and died of a hemorrhage of the aorta.

Awards

1947 New York Herald Tribune Spring Book Festival prize
1948 Newbery Medal runner-up for Pancakes-Paris
1952 Well-Met Children's Book Award, Child Study Association of America for Twenty and Ten
1952 Josette Frank Award for Twenty and Ten 
1959 Lewis Carroll Shelf Award list for The Five Chinese Brothers 
1988 Nicholas and Hedy International Brotherhood award
 All Alone was a runner-up for the Newbery Medal and was chosen as the best-liked book by the Boys' Club of America

Works

Children's books

1938 The Five Chinese Brothers, illustrated by Kurt Wiese
1940 The King's Day, illus. Doris Spiegel
1941 The Ferryman, illus. Wiese
1942 The Man Who Lost His Head, illus. Robert McCloskey
1945 Augustus, illus. Grace Paul
1947 Pancakes-Paris, illus. Georges Schreiber
1948 Blue Spring Farm, a novel, 
1950 Christopher The Giant, illus. Berkeley Williams, Jr.
1952 Bernard and His Dogs, illus. Maurice Brevannes – about Saint Bernard de Menthon, 
1952 Twenty and Ten, by Bishop "as told by Janet Joly", illus. William Pène du Bois,  (re-published with minor edits in 1969 and 1973 as The Secret Cave by Scholastic)
1953 All Alone, illus. Feodor Rojankovsky
1954 Martín de Porres, Hero, illus. Jean Charlot – about Saint Martín de Porres
1955 The Big Loop, illus. Carles Fontserè – about the Tour de France
1956 Happy Christmas: Tales for Boys and Girls, edited by Bishop, illus. Ellen Raskin
1957 Toto's Triumph, illus. Claude Ponsot
1960 French Roundabout, 360 pp. illus. – LCSH France—Description and travel, ; revised 1966
1960 Lafayette: French-American Hero, illus. Maurice Brevannes
1961 A Present from Petros, illus. Dimitris Davis
1964 Twenty-Two Bears, illus. Wiese
1966 Yeshu, Called Jesus, illus. Donald Bolognese
1968 Mozart: Music Magician, illus. Paul Frame
1971 The Truffle Pig, illus. Wiese
1972 Johann Sebastian Bach:  Music Giant, illus. Russell Hoover
1973 Georgette, illus. Ursula Landshoff

Adult books

 1938 French Children's Books for English-speaking Children (New York: Sheridan Square Press), bibliography, 
1947 France Alive
1950 All Things Common
1950 Boimondau: A French Community of Work
1971 Jesus and Israel Jules Isaac
1974 How Catholics look at Jews: Inquiries into Italian, Spanish, and French Teaching Materials

Other Writings
(Editor) Jules Isaac, Has Anti-semitism Roots in Christianity?, National Conference of Christians and Jews, 1961.
(Editor) Isaac, The Teaching of Contempt, Holt, 1964.
Poetry to some French avant-garde literary magazines

Quotes
"Government is too big and too important to be left to the politicians."
"Those who marry to escape something usually find something else."

References

External links

 

1898 births
1993 deaths
20th-century American women writers
American children's writers
American librarians
American women librarians
American Roman Catholics
Newbery Honor winners
Writers from Geneva
Swiss emigrants to the United States
University of Paris alumni
American women children's writers
Swiss expatriates in France